Asil may refer to:

Asil (name)
 American Society of International Law (ASIL)
 Asil, Arabian horses who have pedigrees that can be traced to identifiable desert-bred horses from the Middle East
 Asil chicken, a breed of chicken
 Asil Kara, a synonym for the wine grape variety Băbească neagră
 ASIL Lysi, a Cypriot football club
 Automotive Safety Integrity Level (ASIL), a risk classification scheme

See also
 L'Asile, a commune in the Nippes department of Haiti